Muna Katupose (born 22 February 1988) is a Namibian football forward with Black Africa S.C. and the Namibia national football team. He has 10 caps for Namibia and was on the squad which appeared at the 2008 Africa Cup of Nations, where he appeared in 2 of the 3 matches. He scored the go-ahead goal with Namibia in the clinching qualifying match for the 2008 Africa Cup of Nations against Ethiopia. He is the older brother of fellow footballer Tara Katupose.

References

1988 births
Living people
Namibian men's footballers
Namibia international footballers
2008 Africa Cup of Nations players
Association football forwards
Black Africa S.C. players